Castelo da Lousa is a castle in Portugal. It is classified as a National Monument.

Lousa
National monuments in Évora District
Lousa